Ryfylke is a traditional district in the northeastern part of Rogaland county, Norway.  The  district is located northeast of the city of Stavanger and east of the city of Haugesund and it encompasses about 60% of the county's area. It includes the mainland located northeast and east of the Boknafjorden and east of the Høgsfjorden.  It also includes the islands located on the south side of the Boknafjorden.  To the east, Ryfylke borders the districts of Setesdal and Sirdal, to the south is Jæren, and to the west is Haugalandet.  Ryfylke is one of the 15 districts in Western Norway.

Ryfylke comprises the contemporary municipalities of Sauda, Suldal, Hjelmeland, Strand, Kvitsøy, the eastern island portion of Stavanger, and the Forsand part of Sandnes. There are no large cities in Ryfylke, but there are two major towns, Sauda and Jørpeland.  

Scenic attractions include the Lysefjord with the mountain Preikestolen ("Pulpit Rock") and the mountain Kjerag.  The landscape of Ryfylke is characterized by high mountains in the interior; the highest and wildest are located in the north and are formed by hard, igneous rock.

At Haukalivatnet lake (near Lysefjorden) there is a distinct end moraine presumably created by a prehistoric glacier. This moraine led professor Jens Esmark (in 1824) to formulate the theory of an ice age over Scandinavia and other parts of the world. Esmark believed that climate changes due to the changes of the Earth's orbit caused ice ages.

Etymology
The Old Norse form of the name was Rygjafylki. The first element is the genitive plural of rygir which means "person that eats rye" and the last element is fylke which means "people" and has the same origin as German "volk".

References

External links
Lysefjord and Lysebotn
Destination Ryfylke
Map hiking
Ryfylkemuseeet The Ryfylke Museum

Districts of Rogaland
Sauda
Suldal
Hjelmeland
Strand, Norway
Sandnes
Stavanger
Kvitsøy